This is a list of mobile network operators in Rwanda:

 MTN Rwandacell Plc
 Airtel Rwanda

Market share
As of 31 December 2020, the market share among Rwandan mobile telephone operators was as depicted in the table below.

Note:Totals are slightly off due to rounding.

See also
 Economy of Rwanda

References

External links
Airtel’s Tigo Rwanda take-over As of 5 February 2018.

Kigali
 
Rwanda communications-related lists
Lists of companies of Rwanda